Melvin Agee (November 22, 1968 – June 15, 2008) was a professional American football defensive lineman who played in the National Football League, NFL Europe, and the Arena Football League. In his 10-year professional career he played for the NFL's Indianapolis Colts (1991–1992) and Atlanta Falcons (1992–1995); NFL Europe's Frankfurt Galaxy (1998); and the AFL's Tampa Bay Storm (1998–2002).

While a defensive tackle at the University of Illinois from 1987 through 1990, Agee was selected as All-Big 10 in 1989 and 1990, as well as honorable mention All-American in 1990. He was named as one of the 10 greatest defensive linemen in Illini history by the university, and had 15 sacks during his college career.

He was a sixth round draft choice by the Colts in 1991 and played five seasons in the NFL, both for the Colts and the Falcons.

Agee died of an apparent heart attack at his Lawrenceville, Georgia, home at age 39.

Former NFL agent Josh Luchs alleges in the 18 October 2010 issue of 'Sports Illustrated' that in 1990, he paid Agee 'several hundred dollars' while he was still a defensive lineman at the University of Illinois. If true, this would have been a violation of NCAA rules.

External links
NFL Statistics from FootballDB.com
Arena Football Statistics from ArenaFan.com

Confessions of An Agent', Sports Illustrated, 18 Oct 2010 issue
Former Illini lineman Mel Agee dead at 39

1968 births
2008 deaths
Players of American football from Chicago
American football defensive ends
American football defensive tackles
Illinois Fighting Illini football players
Indianapolis Colts players
Atlanta Falcons players
Frankfurt Galaxy players
Tampa Bay Storm players
American expatriate sportspeople in Germany